Phulo Devi Netam is an Indian politician. She was elected to the Rajya Sabha the upper house of Indian Parliament from Chhattisgarh as a member of the Indian National Congress on 14 September 2020.

References

Living people
Indian National Congress politicians
Rajya Sabha members from Chhattisgarh
Year of birth missing (living people)